Luzhou or Lu Prefecture was a zhou (prefecture) in imperial China centering on modern Hefei, Anhui, China. It existed (intermittently) from 581 to 1277.

Counties
Lu Prefecture administered the following counties through history:

During the Five Dynasties period, Lu Prefecture was administered by Wu from 907 to 937, by Southern Tang from 937 to 958, and by Later Zhou (who seized the prefecture from Southern Tang during the Southern Tang–Later Zhou War) from 958 to 960.

References

 
 
 

Prefectures of the Sui dynasty
Prefectures of the Tang dynasty
Prefectures of the Song dynasty
Prefectures of Yang Wu
Prefectures of Southern Tang
Prefectures of Later Zhou
Former prefectures in Anhui
Hefei
581 establishments
6th-century establishments in China
1277 disestablishments in Asia
13th-century disestablishments in China